Michael "The General" Proctor (born July 14, 1967) is a former American football quarterback who played three seasons with the Charlotte Rage of the Arena Football League. He played college football at Murray State University. He was also a member of the Montreal Machine and Saskatchewan Roughriders. Proctor was inducted into the Murray State University Athletic Hall of Fame in 2000 and his number 11 has  been retired by the Murray State Racers.

References

External links
Just Sports Stats

Living people
1967 births
Players of American football from Georgia (U.S. state)
American football quarterbacks
Canadian football quarterbacks
African-American players of American football
African-American players of Canadian football
Murray State Racers football players
Montreal Machine players
Saskatchewan Roughriders players
Charlotte Rage players
People from Sylvester, Georgia
21st-century African-American people
20th-century African-American sportspeople